Amairani Romero Gutiérrez (born on 6 April 1970), known by the mononym Amairani, is a Mexican actress.

Early life and career 

Amairani was born in Mexico City, Mexico on 6 April 1970. She is the daughter of actress Anabel Gutiérrez. Amairani debuted as an actress in the 1988 telenovela Dulce desafío. She later appeared in the 1989 telenovela Simplemente Maria as Laura Rivera del Villar, followed by playing an antagonist   in the 1992 telenovela Mágica juventud.

She also appeared in the telenovela Más allá del puente as Lupita, replacing Itati Cantoral from the prequel De frente al sol. In 1994, she again played the role of an  antagonist in Marimar. Before her retirement, her last acting role was in La sombra del otro. She retired from telenovelas for the time being, in 1996, to be a mother for her three children. After her last childbirth, she had complications, including paralysis, weight gain and severe depression.

After 11 years, Amairani returned to television screens in Mujer, casos de la vida real. She also played in the telenovelas Lola, érase una vez, Palabra de Mujer, Camaleones and Atrévete a soñar. In 2009, she played the evil Federica Martinez in Nathalie Lartilleux's Mar de amor. In 2011, she appreared in Una familia con suerte, and in 2012, she played in Miss XV and Corona de lágrimas.

Filmography

Television

References

External links 
 

1970 births
Living people
Mexican telenovela actresses
Mexican television actresses
Actresses from Mexico City
20th-century Mexican actresses
21st-century Mexican actresses